Lewis Nunatak is an isolated, mainly snow-covered nunatak located about  southeast of the Davies Escarpment and  southwest of Nolan Pillar, at the south end of the Thiel Mountains of Antarctica. The name was proposed by Peter F. Bermel and Arthur B. Ford, co-leaders of the United States Geological Survey (USGS) Thiel Mountains party which surveyed the area in 1960–61. They named it for Charles R. Lewis, a USGS geologist who worked from various U.S. vessels research in the McMurdo Sound region and in the Balaena Islands during the 1955–56 season.

References

Nunataks of Ellsworth Land